"It's All Right" is a 1963 song recorded by The Impressions and written by the group's lead singer, Curtis Mayfield.  The single was the most successful chart entry of the group's career.  "It's All Right" was one of two top-ten singles for the group on the Billboard Hot 100, and the first of six number ones on the Billboard R&B chart. It also reached number one on the Cash Box R&B chart.

Chart history

Cover versions
 In 1964, jazz pianist Wynton Kelly recorded the song as the title track for his album, It's All Right!
 In 1966, Tommy James and the Shondells recorded a version on their album, It's Only Love.
 In 1967, Etta James recorded a cover of "It's All Right" on her Call My Name album.
 In 1985, Phil Collins performed the song during The No Jacket Required World Tour.
 In 1985, Huey Lewis and the News released a live version of "It's All Right", on "The Power of Love" single. In 1993, they recorded a studio a-capella version for People Get Ready – A Tribute to Curtis Mayfield.
 In 1993, Bruce Springsteen covered the song on the final eight shows of the Bruce Springsteen 1992–1993 World Tour, typically as the closing number. A version featuring Southside Johnny and Steven Van Zandt from June 24, 1993 was released as part of the Bruce Springsteen Archives.
 In 1994, Steve Winwood recorded a cover of "It's All Right" on A Tribute to Curtis Mayfield
 In 2006, Aaron Neville covered "It's All Right," reaching #28 on the US Adult Contemporary chart.
 In 2020, Jon Batiste recorded two covers of the song for the Pixar film Soul. The end credits version of the song is also featured in the soundtrack while the second cover is a duet with Celeste which is not part of the soundtrack.

References

1963 songs
1963 singles
Songs written by Curtis Mayfield
The Impressions songs
ABC Records singles
Huey Lewis and the News songs